Siliwangi Stadium or Stadion Siliwangi is a multi-purpose stadium in Bandung, Indonesia. It is currently used mostly for football matches. The stadium is owned by the Siliwangi Regional Military Commando (Komando Daerah Militer Siliwangi). The stadium holds 25,000.

The Siliwangi Stadium was the former home base for Persib Bandung until the team left the venue in 2012, citing quality of the pitch, and the construction of the Si Jalak Harupat Soreang Stadium and Gelora Bandung Lautan Api Stadium. The military-owned PS TNI played at the venue during the temporary Indonesia Soccer Championship league in 2016, but the team only played two home matches there before moving to Pakansari Stadium due to the stadium being used as a cricket venue for the Pekan Olahraga Nasional.

References

Persib Bandung
Buildings and structures in Bandung
Sports venues in Indonesia
Athletics (track and field) venues in Indonesia
Multi-purpose stadiums in Indonesia
Football venues in Indonesia
Sports venues in West Java
Multi-purpose stadiums in West Java
Football venues in West Java
Athletics (track and field) venues in West Java
Sports venues in Bandung
Multi-purpose stadiums in Bandung
Football venues in Bandung
Athletics (track and field) venues in Bandung
Buildings and structures in West Java
Sport in West Java